Rietje van Erkel (1933 – 11 June 2017) was a Dutch figure skater.

Results

References, external links

results

1933 births
2017 deaths
Dutch female single skaters
Sportspeople from Amsterdam